La Pothouin is a short piece for harpsichord by French baroque composer, Jacques Duphly. It was published in Quatrième Livre de Pièces de Clavecin in Paris in 1768 and is described as "Rondeau: La Pothouin."  It is a short work, usually lasting for between 5 and 7 minutes. It has been described as a "lovely work that induces thoughts of Romantic era keyboard poets". "La Pothouin" is still popular today and is often played in concerts and collections of Baroque music. It has also been transcribed for piano and for guitar.

Origin of name

The origin of the name ‘La Pothouin’ is obscure, though it may be associated with the Pothouin family. Pierre-Salomon Pothouin, Bâtonnier of the Ordre des Avocats (barristers) of the Parlement de Paris from 1745 to 1746, lived and worked in Paris between 1673 and 1755 when Duphly was in residence there. Pothouin’s son Pierre-Charles was also bâtonnier of the barristers of the Parlement of Paris (1775-1776). Another son François-Salomon was known as "Maître Pothouin d'Huillet". 
Pierre-Salomon's elder brother was a librarian in Paris.  
La Pothouin was dedicated to a lawyer of the parliament who died in the year of the publication of the third book of Pieces de Clavecin in 1756. It seems likely therefore that Pierre-Salomon Pothouin was the one to whom the work was dedicated.

Pothouin is also the name of one of the clique of Jansenist lawyers who were among the most staunch defenders of the ancien regime in France between 1720 and 1745.

See also

Power and Politics in Old Regime France, 1720-1745, Peter R. Campbell, Routledge (1996)

References

External links
Article on Duphly's four books of harpsichord pieces. (in French)
Biography of Pierre-Salomon Pothouin (in French)

1768 compositions
Compositions for harpsichord